Echo Lake Country Club is a private, member-owned country club located in Westfield, New Jersey.  The club was founded in 1899 and the golf course was designed by Donald Ross in 1913.

History 
The club was founded as the Cranford Golf Club in 1899 and a 9-hole golf course was designed by Willie Dunn on Lincoln Avenue in Cranford, New Jersey.  
Cranford businessmen and trading-stamp magnates Thomas Sperry and William Miller Sperry were executives of the Cranford Golf Club on Lincoln Avenue, formerly known as Westfield Avenue and part of the Old York Road.  The club's 19th-century grounds off Lincoln Avenue were a former estate said to have supplied lumber to build the USS Constitution ("Old Ironsides") in the 1700s.  The grounds also included the largest sour gum ever recorded in the Northeastern states, known as the Cranford Pepperidge Tree or "Old Peppy."

Young men from the Cranford club went on to fame --- Max Marston of Central Avenue in Cranford, New Jersey won the National Amateur Golf Association Championship, and Dean Mathey won the National Clay Court Tennis Doubles Championship twice.

In 1912, the Cranford Golf Club purchased the Harper Farm in Westfield, New Jersey, and engaged Donald Ross to design the current course which was completed in 1913.  The clubhouse was built on a high bluff overlooking Echo Lake.

In 1921, the Cranford Golf Club and the Westfield Golf Club merged, choosing the name Echo Lake Country Club to reflect both the site, along the upper reaches of the Rahway River Parkway, and the broad country club activities offered.

Tournaments

National Championships
The club has hosted two national championships conducted by the United States Golf Association:

PGA Tour Events

References

External links 
 

Golf clubs and courses designed by Donald Ross
Golf clubs and courses in New Jersey
Westfield, New Jersey
1899 establishments in New Jersey
Organizations established in 1899
History of Union County, New Jersey